Barton Township may refer to the following places:

in Canada
 Barton Township, Ontario, former name for a portion of Hamilton, Ontario

in the United States
 Barton Township, Gibson County, Indiana
 Barton Township, Michigan

Township name disambiguation pages